Charles Victor Corry (born 26 November 1940) is a former Irish cricketer. A right-handed batsman, he made his debut for the Ireland cricket team against Scotland in June 1959, and played for them five times in all, his last match also coming against Scotland in July 1966. Four of his matches for Ireland had first-class status.

References

1940 births
Living people
Irish cricketers
Cricketers from Belfast
Cricketers from Northern Ireland